Francisco Sionil José (December 3, 1924 – January 6, 2022) was a Filipino writer who was one of the most widely read in the English language. A National Artist of the Philippines for Literature, which was bestowed upon him in 2001, José's novels and short stories depict the social underpinnings of class struggles and colonialism in Filipino society. His works—written in English—have been translated into 28 languages, including Korean, Indonesian, Czech, Russian, Latvian, Ukrainian and Dutch. He was often considered the leading Filipino candidate for the Nobel Prize in Literature.

Early life

José was born in Rosales, Pangasinan, the setting of many of his stories.  He spent his childhood in Barrio Cabugawan, Rosales, where he first began to write. José is of Ilocano descent whose family had migrated to Pangasinan prior to his birth. Fleeing poverty, his forefathers traveled from Ilocos towards Cagayan Valley through the Santa Fe Trail. Like many migrant families, they brought their lifetime possessions with them, including uprooted  posts of their old houses and their , a stone mortar for pounding rice.

One of the greatest influences to José was his industrious mother who went out of her way to get him the books he loved to read, while making sure her family did not go hungry despite poverty and landlessness.  José started writing in grade school, at the time he started reading.  In the fifth grade, one of José's teachers opened the school library to her students, which is how José managed to read the novels of José Rizal, Willa Cather’s My Antonia, Faulkner and Steinbeck.  Reading about Basilio and Crispin in Rizal's Noli Me Tangere made the young José cry, because injustice was not an alien thing to him.  When José was five years old, his grandfather who was a soldier during the Philippine revolution, had once tearfully showed him the land their family had once tilled but was taken away by rich mestizo landlords who knew how to work the system against illiterates like his grandfather.

Writing career
José attended the University of Santo Tomas after World War II, but dropped out and plunged into writing and journalism in Manila. In subsequent years, he edited various literary and journalistic publications, started a publishing house, and founded the Philippine branch of PEN, an international organization for writers. José received numerous awards for his work. The Pretenders is his most popular novel, which is the story of one man's alienation from his poor background and the decadence of his wife's wealthy family.

José Rizal's life and writings profoundly influenced José's work. The five volume Rosales Saga, in particular, employs and integrates themes and characters from Rizal's work. Throughout his career, José's writings espouse social justice and change to better the lives of average Filipino families. He is one of the most critically acclaimed Filipino authors internationally, although much underrated in his own country because of his authentic Filipino English and his anti-elite views.

Sionil José also owned Solidaridad Bookshop, located on Padre Faura Street in Ermita, Manila. The bookshop offers mostly hard-to-find books and Filipiniana reading materials. It is said to be one of the favorite haunts of many local writers.

In his regular column, Hindsight, in The Philippine STAR, dated September 12, 2011, he wrote "Why we are shallow", blaming the decline of Filipino intellectual and cultural standards on a variety of modern amenities, including media, the education system—particularly the loss of emphasis on classic literature and the study of Greek and Latin—and the abundance and immediacy of information on the Internet.

Death
José died on the night of January 6, 2022, aged 97, at the Makati Medical Center, where he was scheduled for an angioplasty the next day.

Awards
Five of José's works have won the Carlos Palanca Memorial Awards for Literature: his short stories The God Stealer in 1959, Waywaya in 1979, Arbol de Fuego (Firetree) in 1980, his novel Mass in 1981, and his essay A Scenario for Philippine Resistance in 1979.

Since the 1980s, various award-giving bodies have feted José with awards for his outstanding works and for being an outstanding Filipino in the field of literature. His first award was the 1979 City of Manila Award for Literature which was presented to him by Manila Mayor Ramon Bagatsing. The following year, he was given the prestigious Ramon Magsaysay Award for Journalism, Literature and Creative Communication Arts. Among his other awards during that period include the Outstanding Fulbrighters Award for Literature (1988) and the Cultural Center of the Philippines Award (Gawad para sa Sining) for Literature (1989).

By the turn of the century, José continued to receive recognition from several award-giving bodies. These include the Cultural Center of the Philippines Centennial Award in 1999, the prestigious Chevalier dans l'Ordre des Arts et Lettres in 2000, and the Order of Sacred Treasure (Kun Santo Zuiho Sho) in 2001. In that same year, the Philippine government bestowed upon him the prestigious title of National Artist for Literature for his outstanding contributions to Philippine literature. In 2004, José garnered the coveted Pablo Neruda Centennial Award in Chile.

Works

Rosales Saga novels
A five-novel series that spans three centuries of Philippine history, :
 Po-on (Source) (1984) 
 The Pretenders (1962) 
 My Brother, My Executioner (1973) 
 Mass (December 31, 1974) 
 Tree (1978)

Original novels containing the Rosales Saga
 Source (Po-on) (1993) 
 Don Vicente (1980)  – Tree and My Brother, My Executioner combined in one book
 The Samsons  The Pretenders and Mass combined in one book

Other novels

Novellas
 Three Filipino Women (1992) 
 Two Filipino Women (1981)

Short story collections
 The God Stealer and Other Stories (2001) 
 Puppy Love and Thirteen Short Stories (March 15, 1998)  and 
 Olvidon and Other Stories (1988) 
 Platinum: Ten Filipino Stories (1983)  (now out of print, its stories are added to the new version of Olvidon and Other Stories)
 Waywaya: Eleven Filipino Short Stories (1980) 
 Asian PEN Anthology (as editor) (1966)
 Short Story International (SSI): Tales by the World's Great Contemporary Writers (Unabridged, Volume 13, Number 75) (co-author, 1989)

Children's books
The Molave and The Orchid (November 2004)

Verses
 Questions (1988)

Essays and non-fiction
 In Search of the Word (De La Salle University Press, March 15, 1998)  and 
 We Filipinos: Our Moral Malaise, Our Heroic Heritage (1999)
 Soba, Senbei and Shibuya: A Memoir of Post-War Japan (2000)  and 
 Heroes in the Attic, Termites in the Sala: Why We are Poor (2005)
 This I Believe: Gleanings from a Life in Literature (2006)
 Literature and Liberation (co-author) (1988)

In translation
 Zajatec bludného kruhu (The Pretenders) (Czech language, Svoboda, 1981)
 Po-on (Tagalog language, De La Salle University Press, 1998)  and 
 Anochecer (Littera) (Spanish language, Maeva, October 2003)  and

In anthologies
 Tong  (a short story from Brown River, White Ocean: An Anthology of Twentieth-Century Philippine Literature in English by Luis Francia, Rutgers University Press, August 1993)  and

In film documentaries
 Francisco Sionil José – A Filipino Odyssey by Art Makosinski (Documentary, in color, 28min, 16mm. Winner of the Golden Shortie for Best Documentary at the 1996 Victoria Film and Video Festival)

Reviews

See also

Philippine literature in Spanish
Philippine literature in English
Literature of the Philippines
Philippine English
Thomasites
Philinda Rand
Stevan Javellana

References

Further reading
The Writings of F. Sionil Jose, Archives, The New York Times. Retrieved on June 16, 2007
The Works of Francisco Sionil Jose, The New York Public Library. Retrieved on June 16, 2007
Books of F. Sionil Jose, Amazon.com. Retrieved on June 16, 2007
Filipino English: Literature As We Think It (from F. Sionil Jose's Keynote Lecture at the Conference on "Literatures in Englishes" at the National University of Singapore), F. Sionil Jose: National Artist for Literature, Foremost Novelist, and Stanford.edu, March 19, 2006. Retrieved on June 16, 2007
Jose, F. Sionil.  "We Who Stayed Behind (Many fled the Philippines during the Marcos years, writes F. Sionil Jose. But what about those who remained?)", Asian Journey, Time Asia magazine (18–25 August 2003 issue), Time.com, 11 August 2007. Retrieved on June 21, 2007
Allen Gaborro, A book review about Sins, a novel by F. Sionil Jose, Random House, 1996, Eclectica.org. Retrieved on April 22, 2008
 Frankie Sionil José: A Tribute by Edwin Thumboo (editor) (Times Academic Press, Singapore, January 2005)  and 
 Conversations with F. Sionil José by Miguel A. Bernard (editor) (Vera-Reyes Publishing Inc.,  Philippines, 304 pages, 1991
 The Ilocos: A Philippine Discovery by James Fallows, The Atlantic Monthly magazine, Volume 267, No. 5, May 1991
 F. Sionil José and His Fiction by Alfredo T. Morales (Vera-Reyes Publishing Inc., Philippines, 129 pages)
 Die Rosales Saga von Francisco Sionil José. Postkoloniale Diskurse in der Romanfolge eines Philippinischen Autors by Hergen Albus (SEACOM Edition, Berlin, 2009)
 Post-colonial Discourses in Francisco Sionil José's Rosales Saga: Post-colonial Theory vs. Philippine Reality in the Works of a Philippine Autor by Hergen Albus (Südwestdeutscher Verlag für Hochschulschriften, 14. November 2012)

External links

F. Sionil José: The Myth of a Filipino Writer
Full Text: The God Stealer by F. Sionil Jose

1924 births
2022 deaths
Writers from Pangasinan
Ilocano-language writers
National Artists of the Philippines
Jose, Franciso Sionil
Jose, Franciso Sionil
Filipino novelists
Filipino male short story writers
Filipino short story writers
Ramon Magsaysay Award winners
Chevaliers of the Ordre des Arts et des Lettres
Recipients of the Order of the Sacred Treasure, 3rd class
Ilocano people
The Philippine Star people
Burials at the Libingan ng mga Bayani